is a railway station in the city of Gotemba, Shizuoka Prefecture, Japan, operated by the East Japan Railway Company (JR Tōkai ).

Lines

Station layout
Fujioka Station has a single island platform. The station was originally located on a switchback, which was eliminated when the line was electrified in 1968, and the platform realigned; a vestigial remnant of the former switchback is retained as a side track to the north of the station.　The original side platform was rebuilt as an island platform in 1989. The station building has automated ticket machines, TOICA automated turnstiles and a "Midori no Madoguchi" ticket office, and is staffed only during daytime hours. It is connected to the platform with a footbridge.

Platforms

History 
The station was opened to civilian passengers from 11 November 1944. Along with its division and privatization of JNR on 1 April 1987, the station came under the control and operation of JR Central.

Station numbering was introduced to the Gotemba Line in March 2018; Fujioka Station was assigned station number CB12.

Passenger statistics
In fiscal 2017, the station was used by an average of 1071 passengers daily (boarding passengers only).

Surrounding area
Fujioka Elementary School
Fujioka Junior High School

See also
 List of Railway Stations in Japan

References

External links

 Official website 

Railway stations in Japan opened in 1944
Railway stations in Shizuoka Prefecture
Gotemba Line
Stations of Central Japan Railway Company
Gotemba, Shizuoka